The William Remshart Row House is a historic building in Savannah, Georgia, United States. It comprises the four properties between 102 and 111 West Jones Street, and was completed in 1853. It is a contributing property of the Savannah Historic District, itself on the National Register of Historic Places.

In the mid-19th century, the property was documented by the Historic American Buildings Survey as being significant for its representation of mid-19th-century Savannah row houses, particularly due to its high stoops. Other similar-style row houses exist in Savannah's Gordon Row, the Jones Street Quantock Row, the Chatham Square Quantock Row, Scudder's Row, McDonough Row and Marshall Row.

It was built for William Remshart (1804–1878), a prominent Savannah commission merchant.

The properties in 2022

References

See also 

 Buildings in Savannah Historic District

Houses in Savannah, Georgia
Houses completed in 1853
Savannah Historic District